George Rayner Hoff (27 November 1894 – 19 November 1937) was a British-born sculptor who mainly worked in Australia. He fought in World War I and is chiefly known for his war memorial work, particularly the sculptures on the ANZAC War Memorial in Sydney.

Early life and training

Hoff was born on the Isle of Man, the son of a stone and wood carver of Dutch descent. He began helping his father on architectural commissions at a very young age and briefly attended the Nottingham School of Art where he studied drawing, design, and modelling, from 1910 to 1915. During World War I, he was in the British Army and fought in the trenches in France, an experience from which he was to draw most passionately in the creation of his various war memorials. Later in the war, he made maps based on aerial photographs.

Returning from the trenches following the War he enrolled in the Royal College of Art in London studying under Francis Derwent Wood for three years. In 1922, Hoff won the British Prix de Rome which allowed him the opportunity to study in Rome. There he did little work in sculpture beyond making sketch models but drew much and mentally studied the many examples of classical and Renaissance art to be found in that country. In May 1923, on the recommendation of Sir George Frampton, R.A., and F. Derwent Wood, R.A., he became director of sculpture and drawing at the East Sydney Technical College (Australia) and set up his private studio. In 1933, he was named the head of the ESTC Art School.

Australian work
Hoff came to Australia as a young man of 28. He soon adapted himself to Australian conditions, and his quiet, slightly whimsical personality made him generally liked. He was a quick worker and an artist of great originality, although his work, originally based on the Greeks, shows he had paid attention to tradition. He had studied much that was best in Italian work of the Renaissance, the Assyrian friezes, the attempt to retain only the essentials, characteristic of some of the moderns, and the simple sincerity of the Chinese.

His modelling is in a lyrical, classical art-deco manner which effortlessly combines sensuous curves with geometric line patterns.

Hoff's coming to Sydney was a great gain to Australia. He speedily reorganized the school and succeeded in winning the enthusiasm of the students. He became a member of the Society of Artists and sent work to their exhibitions. In 1924 he designed their medal, and in 1927 was responsible for sculpture for the National War Memorial at Adelaide. In the same year he was awarded the Wynne prize at Sydney. His best-known works are the figures on the exterior of the ANZAC War Memorial in Hyde Park, Sydney, the central group in the interior, and the bronze reliefs. The figures on the exterior and the interior group, including Sacrifice, are cited by sculptor, Ron Robertson-Swann as "Sydney's most moving example of publicly visible architecture". Art historian, Professor Virginia Spate, wrote in 1999: "Even incomplete, [it] is the most perfect sculptural monument in Australia." An example of his sculpture associated with architecture is at the University of Sydney, where four medallion portraits of great scientists are on the façade of the physics building.

Rayner also produced a variety of smaller work, built up a fine school of sculpture, and in 1934 was commissioned to design the Victorian centenary medal. His use of a ram's head as the design for one side of it was much criticized, and it is not one of his most successful efforts. At the time of his death on 19 November 1937 he was engaged on the George V Memorial for Canberra. He had recently been commissioned to design part of the new coinage for the Commonwealth, and earlier in 1937 had become an invited foundation member of Robert Menzies' anti-modernist organisation, the Australian Academy of Art.

Among his works is the emblem of the Holden Australian car company, a stylised 'Lion and Stone' symbol representing a legend of man's invention of the wheel.

Architectural sculpture 
The ANZAC War Memorial, completed in 1934, is the main commemorative military monument in Sydney, designed by C. Bruce Dellit, has an exterior adorned with monumental figural reliefs and sculptures by Rayner Hoff, and is arguably the finest Art Deco structure in Australia.

Medallions for various University of Sydney buildings, 1924
Royal Arch Masonic Temple, Sydney, Australia, 1927. More specifically the Egyptian Room in the Petersham Temple, he was a Freemason himself.
The Spirit of Womanhood, National War Memorial, Adelaide, South Australia, 1927–30

Figures and panels, ANZAC War Memorial, Hyde Park, Sydney, Australia, 1931–34
Theatre Arts & Pan Liberty Theatre, Sydney, Australia, 1934
Ride of the Valkyries relief panel, Hotel Manly, Manly, Australia, 1935
Panels, Hotel Sydney, Sydney, Australia, 1935
Relief panels, City Mutual Life Insurance building, Sydney, Australia, 1936
Mercury, Transportation House, Sydney, Australia, 1938

Other works 

 War memorial panels, Dubbo, New South Wales
 Australian Venus, Art Gallery of New South Wales, 1927
Sacrifice, figure inside ANZAC Memorial, Hyde Park, Sydney, 1934
Thomas Ranken Lyle Medal for outstanding research by an Australian mathematician or physicist, first awarded in 1935.
Bust of William Farrer in Queanbeyan, New South Wales, 1937
King George V Memorial, Canberra, 1937-53 (designed by Hoff and finished by John Moorefield following Hoff's death)
 Bronze memorial plaque to John Irvine Hunter in Wesley College, University of Sydney

Death
Hoff died eight days before his 43rd birthday. He was survived by his wife and two daughters.

Further reading
Daele, Patrick and Roy Lumby, A Spirit of Progress: Art Deco Architecture in Australia, Craftsman House, Sydney, 1997
Edwards, Deborah, This Vital Flesh: The Sculpture of Rayner Hoff and His School, Art Gallery of New South Wales, 1999
Hedger, Michael, Public Sculpture in Australia, Craftsman House, 1995
Hutchison, Noel S. Hoff, George Rayner (1894 - 1937), Australian Dictionary of Biography, Volume 9, Melbourne University Press, 1983, pp 322–323.
Inglis, K.S., Sacred Places: War Memorials in the Australian Landscape, Melbourne University Press, Carlton South, 1998

Sturgeon, Graeme, The Development of Australian Sculpture 1788–1975, Thames & Hudson, London, 1978
Beck, Deborah, Rayner Hoff: The life of a sculptor, NewSouth Publishing, 2017

References 

1894 births
1937 deaths
Architectural sculptors
Alumni of the Royal College of Art
Art Deco sculptors
Manx emigrants to Australia
Australian people of Dutch descent
20th-century Australian sculptors
British Army personnel of World War I
Royal Engineers soldiers
King's Regiment (Liverpool) soldiers
Prix de Rome (Britain) winners
Wynne Prize winners
20th-century British sculptors
British male sculptors
Manx artists
20th-century British male artists